USS Ganges was a man-of-war in the United States Navy during the Quasi-War with France.

She was originally a fast sailing merchantman, built in Philadelphia in 1794 for the East Indies trade and named for the Ganges, India's principal river, which flows into the Bay of Bengal. Ganges regularly sailed to Calcutta and Canton. Apparently she returned to civilian service after serving in the U.S. Navy between 1798 and 1801.

Service history
She retained her merchant name when the U.S. Navy purchased her from the firm of Willing and Francis of Philadelphia on 3 May 1798. She cost $58,000 or $80,665, depending on the source. With hostilities with France imminent, the Navy hastily fitted her out, making her the first man-of-war to fit out and get to sea under the second organization of the Navy. In Navy service she is described as being of 504 tons, and carrying 24 guns and a crew of 220 men. Her first captain was Captain Richard Dale, who had returned in her from a voyage to China.

1798
Ganges sailed from Philadelphia on 24 May 1798 under Richard Dale, whose orders directed him to "seize, take and bring into a port of the United States" French armed ships "committing depredations" within one marine league of the coast between the Capes of Virginia and Long Island. On 13 July, further orders authorized her to take any French armed ship wherever found, but she continued patrol between Cape Henry and Long Island for the protection of the large seaport cities. On 30 July, Ganges was directed to return to Philadelphia for refitting, but put into New York City instead because of fever and plague at Philadelphia.

In mid-September 1798, Captain Thomas Tingey relieved Captain Dale and, on 7 December, his ship was ordered to the Windward Passage between Cuba and Hispaniola to join the squadron protecting the Jamaican trade. Cruising in these waters with General Pinkney and South Carolina, she guarded American merchantmen from seizure by French naval vessels, privateers, and "all armed vessels acting without commission."

1799
On 6 January 1799, off the Island of Tortuga, Ganges fell in with the sloop Ceres, off her course for no apparent reason and suspected of heading for illegal trade at Cap Français. Tingey detained the captain of Ceres, questioned him, and reported to intelligence. The incident occasioned the following passage from Tingey's letter of concern to Benjamin Stoddert, the Secretary of the Navy:

On 21 February, officers of the 28-gun English frigate  boarded Ganges off Cape Nichola Mole, Hispaniola, and demanded all Englishmen aboard. Tingey firmly replied:

The crew gave three cheers, ran to quarters, and called for "Yankee Doodle". Surprise departed.

Having returned home for repairs in March, Ganges convoyed Kingston, carrying American Consul General Dr. Edward Stevens, to talk with Toussaint Louverture in Haiti. She then cruised the Caribbean from Havana to Puerto Rico, St. Thomas, St. Kitts, St. Bartholomew's, Santo Domingo, Barbuda, and Jamaica.

On 21 April off Cape Isabella she seized the American sloop Mary, of Norwich, for illegal trading. That same day she recaptured the American ship Eliza of Charleston.  The French privateer Telemaque, Captain Arnault, had captured her and she was sailing under a prize crew. Ganges sent the two vessels together to Philadelphia.

On 16 June, Ganges, with Norfolk, captured the 8-gun French privateer Vainquere (formerly British Harlequin) off Saint Bartholomews after a 90-mile chase lasting more than eight hours and requiring the expenditure of some 40 cannon shot.  The privateer's crew numbered some 85 men. The prize sailed to Norfolk under Captain Pitcher.

The hurricane season approached and it was thought Ganges should return to the United States, but Tingey proudly reported his ship could withstand the Caribbean storms:

On 5 August, Ganges captured the 6-gun schooner La Rabateuse after a 12-hour chase in which the privateer threw overboard all her guns and endured 13 cannon shot before surrendering. On 16 August Ganges retook the  American schooner John, laden with sugar and cotton, from the French. Three days later, Ganges captured a small French "letter of marque" off St. Thomas. She later captured L'Eugene with 28 men and on 2 October recaptured the American schooner Laurel, which the French had renamed L'Esperance.

Ganges returned to Philadelphia in the fall and Captain John Mullowny relieved Captain Tingey on 16 November. That December, she sailed for the West Indies, again convoying American merchantmen until May 1800, when she returned to the States.

1800
On 25 May 1800, Captain Mullowny received orders to proceed to Havana, and Ganges shortly departed Philadelphia for another eventful cruise. On 19 July, she captured the schooner Prudent off the coast of Cuba; on the 20th recaptured American brigantine Dispatch; and the 21st, the third successful day in a row, took schooner Phoebe. On 28 July, Ganges captured French privateer La Fortune et Louis. In September, her crew ridden with fever, she returned to the United States.

The Phoebe and the Prudent were two illegal U.S. slave schooners. Ganges brought them to Fort Mifflin in Philadelphia as prizes. Mullowny chose Philadelphia because of the city's strong anti-slavery sentiments. The 135 Africans on board were detained at the Lazaretto for 31 days while their legal status was established. During their stay, the staff of the Lazaretto nursed the emaciated and diseased slaves back to health. The Pennsylvania Abolition Society took guardianship of the Africans, gave them the last name "Ganges" and dispersed them locally via indentures. Apparently most eventually became part of Pennsylvania's population of free blacks.

1801
Sailing again 31 January 1801, Ganges proceeded with a convoy for Havana. En route she was severely damaged by a storm and put into Basseterre, St. Christopher. Here, Commodore John Barry surveyed the ship on 2 March and found her "unfit for sea." Being unable to continue her voyage, Ganges remained on the Guadeloupe station until May, then proceeded north with a convoy that reached Philadelphia early in June. On 10 June 1801, under provision of the Peace Establishment Act, the Navy agent at Philadelphia prepared Ganges for sale. She was sold prior to 8 December for $21,000. The Navy was reduced to thirteen vessels and the Ganges again became a merchant ship.

People associated with Ganges
One of the passengers aboard the Ganges when it arrived at Philadelphia on 31 March 1806 had an Indian surname, Singh.

Officers and midshipmen of Ganges included several future heroes such as Thomas Macdonough, James Lawrence, Jacob Jones, and Daniel Carmick.

References

Sloops of the United States Navy
Quasi-War ships of the United States
1794 ships